Androsace lactea, the milkwhite rock jasmine, is an alpine plant, in the family Primulaceae.

Description
The leaves are shining dark green, linear or lightly elliptic. Flowers are white with a yellow centre,  in diameter, with broadly notched petals. They bloom from May to August.

Distribution
Androsace lactea is endemic to the Alps and Carpathians.

Habitat

References

Pignatti S. - Flora d'Italia (3 voll.) - Edagricole - 1982
Tutin, T.G. et al. - Flora Europaea, second edition - 1993

External links
Biolib
Luirig.altervista
Alpine Plant Encyclopaedia

lactea
Flora of Central Europe
Flora of the Alps
Plants described in 1753
Taxa named by Carl Linnaeus
Flora of the Carpathians